Ida Mabel Fuller Pierce (November 26, 1854—September 26, 1930) was one of the five founding members of Sigma Kappa sorority in the American university system.

Fuller served as one of the co-founders of the Sigma Kappa sorority, along with Mary Caffrey Low Carver, Elizabeth Gorham Hoag, Frances Elliott Mann Hall and Louise Helen Coburn. The group founded the sorority at Colby College in Waterville, Maine on November 9, 1874. They were the only female students at Colby at that time. Colby College became the first New England college to admit women along with men.

Being the only women in the college, the five of them found themselves together frequently. In 1873–74, the five young women decided to form a literary and social society. They were instructed by the college administration that they would need to present a constitution and bylaws with a petition requesting permission to form Sigma Kappa Sorority. They began work during that year and on November 9, 1874, the five young women received a letter from the faculty approving their petition. They sought for and received permission to form a sorority with the intent for the organization to become national.

Fuller was 20 years old when she decided to attend Colby College. Her brother Blin, upset that she would dare try to attend a men's school, refused to attend Colby if she went. Although Fuller men had always attended Colby, Blin went to Bowdoin College instead. At the college, Fuller found a natural set of friends with the only other women attending the school. She was said to contribute to the forming of Sigma Kappa with her practical ideas and nature.

After leaving Colby in her junior year, Fuller went to Kansas to seek a drier climate.  In Kansas, she met and married Dr. Pierce. In later years, after his death, she became a successful businesswoman, founded a hotel for girls in Kansas City, and was vice-president of a bank.

Fuller helped her niece Abby Fuller, Blin's daughter, to found the Xi chapter of Sigma Kappa at the University of Kansas. Both her nieces attended the University of Kansas, and Ida May served as the university Sigma Kappa chapter's housemother for several years.

A loyal convention attender, Ida May was always willing to travel to Sigma Kappa functions and was present at the 1924 Golden Jubilee Convention.

Fuller died September 26, 1930 and is buried in Greenwood Cemetery, Eureka, Kansas.

External links
 Sigma Kappa Sorority official site
 Five Founders of Sigma Kappa

1854 births
1930 deaths
People from Waterville, Maine
Colby College alumni
Sigma Kappa founders